Michael Cheng Chun-leung (born 30 April 1994) is a Hong Kong windsurfer.

He qualified for the 2016 Summer Olympics in Rio de Janeiro, and was selected to represent Hong Kong in the men's RS:X event.

References

External links
 
 
 

1994 births
Living people
Hong Kong windsurfers
Hong Kong male sailors (sport)
Olympic sailors of Hong Kong
Sailors at the 2010 Summer Youth Olympics
Sailors at the 2016 Summer Olympics – RS:X
Sailors at the 2020 Summer Olympics – RS:X
Asian Games silver medalists for Hong Kong
Asian Games medalists in sailing
Sailors at the 2018 Asian Games
Medalists at the 2018 Asian Games